Carlowrightia ecuadoriana is a species of plant in the family Acanthaceae. It is endemic to Ecuador.  Its natural habitat is subtropical or tropical dry forests.

References

Acanthaceae
Endemic flora of Ecuador
Critically endangered flora of South America
Taxonomy articles created by Polbot
Plants described in 1993